The Kaimai Range (sometimes referred to as the Kaimai Ranges) is a mountain range in the North Island of New Zealand.  It is part of a series of ranges, with the Coromandel Range to the north and the Mamaku Ranges to the south. The Kaimai Range separates the Waikato in the west from the Bay of Plenty in the east.

The highest point of the range is Mount Te Aroha (953 m), at the foot of which is the town of Te Aroha. The range's terrain is rough, and only two roads pass over it: State Highway 2, across the northern end of the range through Karangahake Gorge, and State Highway 29 from Tauranga to Hamilton. Mt Te Aroha can be described as the northern head peak of the Kaimai Range.

The New Zealand Ministry for Culture and Heritage gives a translation of "eat fermented food" for Kaimāī.

The Kaimai Ranges feature in local Maori folklore. The name Te Aroha translates from Maori as Te - The & Aroha  - Love. Literally "the love". The name comes from a Maori legend that the sun god - male - loved the moon goddess - female. They never could see each another due to the planets positions. One day the moon goddess came to earth to see the sun god, knowing the risks, was turned to stone as the daylight came. Hers was the ultimate expression of love. Te Aroha in Maori. This is why on the Kaimai Range, to the right of Mt Te Aroha is a high skyline silhouetted rock that from afar is shaped as a woman. It is known locally as the rock of Hinemoa.

Within the Kaimai Ranges the Hendersons Tramline loop track follows the route of bush tramlines and haul lines once used to extract logs from the bush. The walk includes forest and clearings near the fringe of the park. A side track off the main walk leads down to the base of a waterfall and a large swimming hole.
Also some 10–16 km, on the Gordon backroad from te Aroha is a four-wheel drive track named Thomsons track, that takes venturers from the foothills around manawaru to the ranges top, where a large swimming hole is present.

Geology and history
The Kaimai Range is the result of a fault that uplifted primarily andesitic rocks from long-extinct volcanoes. This fault has not been active for about 140,000 years and started more than a million years ago. In pre-European times, the area was densely forested by trees such as kauri, mataī and tawa, and was a home for birds such as kererū, tui, kākā and kiwi.

Demographics

Kaimai had a population of 2,028 at the 2018 New Zealand census, an increase of 276 people (15.8%) since the 2013 census, and an increase of 327 people (19.2%) since the 2006 census. There were 678 households, comprising 1,026 males and 1,005 females, giving a sex ratio of 1.02 males per female. The median age was 40.8 years (compared with 37.4 years nationally), with 426 people (21.0%) aged under 15 years, 312 (15.4%) aged 15 to 29, 1,062 (52.4%) aged 30 to 64, and 225 (11.1%) aged 65 or older.

Ethnicities were 94.4% European/Pākehā, 12.4% Māori, 1.0% Pacific peoples, 1.3% Asian, and 2.2% other ethnicities. People may identify with more than one ethnicity.

The percentage of people born overseas was 15.1, compared with 27.1% nationally.

Although some people chose not to answer the census's question about religious affiliation, 60.2% had no religion, 29.7% were Christian, 0.6% had Māori religious beliefs, 0.1% were Buddhist and 0.9% had other religions.

Of those at least 15 years old, 273 (17.0%) people had a bachelor's or higher degree, and 252 (15.7%) people had no formal qualifications. The median income was $36,800, compared with $31,800 nationally. 309 people (19.3%) earned over $70,000 compared to 17.2% nationally. The employment status of those at least 15 was that 915 (57.1%) people were employed full-time, 276 (17.2%) were part-time, and 42 (2.6%) were unemployed.

Kaimai Tunnel
The Kaimai Railway Tunnel runs for nearly nine kilometres under the range, making it the longest tunnel in New Zealand. Construction of the tunnel started from both sides of the range in 1969: the headings met in 1976 and the tunnel opened on 12 September 1978. The Kaimai Range and this tunnel led to a Silver Fern railcar service between Auckland and Tauranga being named the Kaimai Express. This service operated from 1991 until 2001.

A peak of the Kaimai directly above the tunnel, previously unnamed, was named Stokes Peak in 2010 in honour of geographer Evelyn Stokes.

Flight 441 disaster
At approximately 9:09 am on 3 July 1963 the DC-3 Skyliner ZK-AYZ Hastings operating New Zealand National Airways Corporation Flight 441 from Whenuapai Airport, Auckland to Tauranga crashed into the range. All 23 aboard died, making it the worst air disaster in mainland New Zealand.

Communications
The New Zealand Post Office engineering division (radio) built and maintained a microwave communications facility near the top of Kaimai range, close to the Hamilton–Tauranga highway saddle. In the 1960s it was a Lenkurt relay as part of the national network, linking Sanitorium Hill near Cambridge to Rotorua, with a spur to Tauranga. It now has cell phone and various other radio communications facilities, and is owned and operated by Telecom New Zealand. Land Parcel: Part Section 126 Block II Tapapa SD 

The New Zealand Broadcasting Corporation (NZBC) commissioned a television broadcast relay station atop Mount Te Aroha in 1963, relaying Auckland's AKTV2 channel (now part of TVNZ 1) to Hamilton and Tauranga. Today, Mount Te Aroha is the main television transmitter and one of two main FM radio transmitters (along with Ruru) serving the Waikato.

Airways New Zealand maintains a secondary surveillance radar and ADS-B installation on Te Weraiti, a peak on the Kaimai range, 5 kilometers north of the State Highway 29 saddle. This is used to facilitate air traffic control.

See also
 Tunnels in New Zealand
 Matamata-Piako District
 Western Bay of Plenty District
 Ohinemuri River

References

External links

 Kaimai Bush
 DC3 Airliner Crash
 Rail Tunnel
 Kaimai Mamaku Forest Park

Mountain ranges of New Zealand
Landforms of the Bay of Plenty Region
Mountain ranges of Waikato
Ngāti Hinerangi
Matamata-Piako District
Western Bay of Plenty District